Kovalezhi Cheeramputhoor Sankara Paniker (31 May 1911 – 16 January 1977) was an Indian metaphysical and abstract painter from Malabar District. He interpreted the country's age-old metaphysical and spiritual knowledge in the 1960s, when Indian art was under the influence of the Western painters. "That was the time when a few Indian artists were trying to break out of this Western influence and establish an idiom and identity of their own," he said.

In 1976, he was awarded the highest award of the Lalit Kala Akademi, India's National Academy of Art, the Fellow of the Lalit Kala Akademi for lifetime contribution.

Early life and education
Born in malabar on 31 May 1911, Paniker received his education in present-day Kerala and later in Tamil Nadu. The lush green village where Paniker lived influenced the colourful landscapes of his early years. The bright colours stayed in his paintings, even though he moved away from landscapes and onto other subject matters.

A virtual child prodigy, Paniker began painting landscapes when he was 12. By the age of 17, he was  exhibiting at the Madras Fine Arts Society's annual shows. In 1928, he gave up college education to take up a job at the Indian Telegraph Department to support his family after the death of his father.

At the age of 25 he joined the Government School of Arts and Crafts, Chennai (1936–40). And also studied in Madras Christian College

Career
Since 1941, Paniker has been holding one man shows in Chennai and Delhi. He founded the Progressive Painters’ Association (P.P.A), in Chennai in 1944. In 1954 he got his first international exposure when he held exhibitions at London and Paris. He became the principal of the Government College of Fine Arts, Chennai, in 1957, and in 1966 formed the Cholamandal Artists' Village, 9 km from Chennai, with his students and a few fellow artists.

The exhibitions abroad and his exposure to abstract artists like Salvador Dalí had a major influence on his art. "They hark back to the weird, but spiritually uplifting figurative exaggerations of ancient Indian painting and sculpture," Paniker said.

The colours he used were bright and sunny, as are colors in the paintings of the Impressionists. Somewhere down the line, Paniker moved on to use calligraphy and symbols to project a state of metaphysical abstraction.

KCS Paniker died in Madras at the age 66 on 16 January 1977.

Legacy

KCS Paniker is considered as a leading figure in the Madras Art Movement. He is the founder of Cholamandal Artists' Village.

References

External links

 "KCS Paniker: The Rhythm of Symbols, a documentary on Paniker's works"
 Cholamandal Artists' Village, Official website
 Primary source for this page
 "Detailed site on K.C.S Paniker"
 , The Hindu

1911 births
1977 deaths
People from Coimbatore
Painters from Kerala
Indian art educators
Fellows of the Lalit Kala Akademi
Government College of Fine Arts, Chennai alumni
20th-century Indian painters
University of Madras alumni
Indian male painters
Painters from Tamil Nadu
20th-century Indian male artists